Breakfast in the Field is the debut recording by guitarist Michael Hedges released on the Windham Hill label in 1981. It was recorded live to 2-track, with no overdubs.

Hedges composed and recorded "Eleven Small Roaches", "Baby Toes" and "Two Days Old" on a six-string guitar built in 1978 by Ken DuBourg of Arbutus, Maryland. The remaining tracks were recorded using a guitar made by Ervin Somogyi.

Reception

Music critic Jason Anderson, writing for Allmusic, wrote of the album "Hedges' compositional abilities alone would have been enough to mesmerize musicians and audiophiles, but his added improvisational skills put this recording way over the top both technically and artistically... While Hedges' follow-up, Aerial Boundaries, is often described as the guitarist's masterpiece, Breakfast in the Field has an early career spark and meditative yet passionate conviction that can't be surpassed.."

Track listing
All compositions by Michael Hedges.

 "Layover" – 2:32
 "The Happy Couple" – 3:23
 "Eleven Small Roaches" – 3:01
 "The Funky Avocado" – 2:05
 "Baby Toes" – 2:12
 "Breakfast in the Field" – 2:23
 "Two Days Old" – 4:44
 "Peg Leg Speed King" – 3:20
 "The Unexpected Visitor" – 2:49
 "Silent Anticipations" – 3:19
 "Lenono" – 3:55

Personnel
Michael Hedges – acoustic guitar
Michael Manring – fretless bass
George Winston – piano

Production notes
Produced by Will Ackerman
Engineered by Russell bond
Design by Anne Robinson

References 

1981 debut albums
Michael Hedges albums
Windham Hill Records albums
Albums produced by William Ackerman